LOT Polish Airlines Flight 5055 was a scheduled international passenger flight from Warsaw, Poland, to New York City, United States. In the late-morning hours of 9 May 1987, the Ilyushin Il-62M operating the flight crashed in the Kabaty Woods nature reserve on the outskirts of Warsaw around 56 minutes after departure.  All 183 passengers and crew on board were killed in the crash, making it the deadliest accident involving an Ilyushin Il-62, and the deadliest aviation disaster in Polish history.

The accident was determined to have been caused by the disintegration of an engine shaft due to faulty bearings.  This led to a catastrophic failure of the two left engines and then an onboard fire, both of which eventually destroyed all flight-control systems.

Aircraft 
The aircraft was a 186-seat Ilyushin Il-62M built in the third quarter of 1983, registered SP-LBG and named Tadeusz Kościuszko, after the Polish military leader and national hero. The Il62M has four tail-mounted engines, with two on the left side (numbers 1 and 2) and two on the right side (numbers 3 and 4). The proximity of the two pairs of engines would prove critical during the accident sequence.

Passengers and crew 

All of the crew members were Polish. The captain, was 59 years old, with 19,745 flight hours' experience (5,542 on Ilyushin Il-62s), and a captain of the type from 11 May 1978. The first officer, Leopold Karcher, was aged 44. The remaining flight crew were flight engineer, Wojciech Kłossek, aged 43, flight navigator, Lesław Łykowski, aged 47; a 43-year-old radio operator, Leszek Bogdan; and Ryszard Chmielewski, a 53-year-old trainer of flight engineers on a routine observation of his progress. Five flight attendants were on board; one was stationed in the technical cabin bay, between the engines, and probably either lost consciousness and burned in the fire or was sucked out of the aircraft after decompression; her body was never found despite an extensive search.

Of the 172 passengers on board, 155 were from Poland, while the other 17 were from the United States.

Accident summary 

The chartered aircraft to New York City took off from runway 33 at Okęcie Airport at 10:18 am. The flight was to continue on to San Francisco after refueling in New York.

Had they not applied thrust, the turbine disc in the inner left (number 2) engine would probably have survived the entire flight. The turbine disc on the burning engine separated from the destroyed shaft; the freed disc spun to an enormous speed, and within seconds, exploded. Debris from the explosion violently spread around, puncturing the fuselage, severing flight controls and electrical cables, and causing severe damage to the adjoining engine number 1—the outer left one, which soon also started to burn. A piece of hot debris burst into cargo hold number 4 and caused a rapidly spreading fire; the inner left engine burned rapidly until impact.

Immediately, the crew noticed that the elevator control systems had failed—only the pitch trim remained operative—and that two engines were disabled. The reasons for this were unknown to the crew; they initially suspected that the aircraft could have been hit by something, possibly another aircraft. The closest airport where the Il-62 might land was Gdańsk, but landing there was not possible because the crew could not dump enough fuel for the emergency landing attempt (the takeoff weight of the aircraft on that day was 167 tons, until 10:41 about 6 tons of fuel were consumed; the maximum landing weight of the Il-62M was 107 tons), so they turned their heading to Okęcie, instead. Due to the damaged electrical system, the crew had problems with fuel dumping, and they did not realize that the fire had spread to the cargo holds in the back of the aircraft (cargo holds 4 and 6), and in the final minutes probably spread into the passenger cabin.

Initially, the crew intended to land at the military airport in Modlin, but at the final moment, they decided to return to Okęcie, which had better emergency equipment. Why the crew decided to continue the flight to Warsaw was initially unclear at the time, given the rapidly spreading fire and lost flight controls, rather than land as quickly as possible at Modlin. Modlin's emergency equipment was not as good as Okęcie's, but still good enough to deal with an emergency landing of an airliner with an in-flight fire. Many at the time believed officials had decided the airliner must not land at a military airport and (contrary to official reports) denied the crew's request to land at Modlin. While this is somewhat plausible, no conclusive evidence supporting this theory was ever presented. Instead, the cause was later determined to be the damage to the electrical systems preventing both the fire detectors in the cargo hold and inside the engine from working properly (on the cockpit voice recorder (CVR), an engine fire warning was heard shortly after the explosion, but it later faded out; the signal reappeared less than four minutes before the crash and continued until impact), so Cpt. Pawlaczyk did not know about the magnitude of the fire in the hold and how quickly it was spreading, nor about the burning engine when he decided to fly to Warsaw.

At 10:53, fuel vapors that had drifted into the burning cargo from the damaged fuel tanks exploded.

The passengers were fully aware of the emergency; 58-year-old passenger Halina Domeracka managed to write on the opening page of her New Testament: "9.05.1987 The aircraft's damaged... God, what will happen now... Halina Domeracka, R. Tagore St., Warsaw..."

CVR fragment—the moment of engine explosion

10.41.28 Intermittent acoustic signal of autopilot disengagement

10.41.30 Crew: Hey! Pressurization!

10.41.32 Acoustic ringing signal of cabin decompression

10.41.34 Crew: Is there a fire? What's going on?

10.41.35 Crew: Probably a fire.

10.41.37 Crew: Engine? Shut it down!

10.41.39 Crew: ...shut down. That first one is burning!

10.41.42 Crew: ...fire...

10.41.44 Crew: ...all small [referring to engines' throttles]

10.41.45 Crew: Warsaw?

10.41.46 Crew: ...all small. Decompression.

10.41.48 Crew: Two engines are gone!

10.41.49 Continuous acoustic signal of engine fire.

10.41.50 Crew: Two engines are gone! [...] Shut down... [...] We're turning around! Fire!

10.41.55 Crew: Danger!!! Warsaw radar LOT! Warsaw radar! [calling flight control]

The crew tried to land at Okęcie from the south (due to strong wind) and turned the aircraft 180° to runway 33, but the rapidly spreading in-flight fire, which spread to the exterior of the aircraft (which was trailing a huge flame and dense black smoke), caused a total failure of surviving flight controls, including the pitch trim. The landing gear also was not functioning. The emergency fuel dumping pumps were also malfunctioning; sometimes they stopped functioning at all, only to resume dumping fuel minutes later. At the moment of the crash, around 32 tons of fuel were still in the tanks. Supposedly, at this moment, the fire destroyed the pitch trim controls. (Fire from the cargo hold was found to have spread into the rear part of passenger cabin, causing mass panic; the passengers moved towards the nose of the aircraft, away from the fire, destabilizing the aircraft and causing the dive. The fire also deformed the aft fuselage, which—combined with strong forces acting on the empennage—altered the aircraft's angle of attack and contributed to the rapid dive.)

11.09.47 am

Crew: Understood.

Crew: ...[turn] to the left! Engines to the left!

11.10.13 am

Tower: 5055, to the left, to the left zero-five-zero.

Crew: OK.

11.10.40 am

Tower: 5055, to the left, course 360.

Crew: We want to turn. That's just what we want. [implied meaning: "we're trying"]

Tower: Keep turning, turn to three-six-zero.

Crew: OK.

11.11.02 am

Tower: 5055, to the left, course 330.

Crew: We are turning to the left.

Crew: We will do all we can.

Tower: Understood.

Tower: [Turn] to the left, course 320.

Crew: Understood.

11.11.34 am

Tower: You've come to the right hand side of the runway centerline, continue left, course 300.

Tower: Wind is 290 degrees, . You are cleared for runway three-three.

Crew: OK.

11.12.10 am

Transmitter turned on four times; fragments of unintelligible utterances

11.12.13 am

Crew: Good night! Goodbye! Bye, we're dying!

The last words inside the cockpit recorded by the CVR at 11:12:13 were: "Dobranoc! Do widzenia! Cześć, giniemy!" (Eng. Good night! Goodbye! Bye, we're dying!). All 172 passengers and 11 crew died as the aircraft broke apart and crashed.

Cause 

After the crash of the Il-62 operating as LOT Polish Airlines Flight 007, the airline had started replacing its Ilyushin Il-62s with the more modernized Ilyushin Il-62M version. These had newer engines (Soloviev D-30 instead of Kuznetsov NK-8), but both of these turbofan engines shared the same critical point—low pressure turbine and engine shaft design and construction.

According to the Polish investigatory commission, the cause of the crash was the disintegration of an engine shaft due to faulty bearings inside the number 2 engine, which seized, causing extensive heat. This, in turn, caused the consequent damage to engine number 1 (and its fire), rapid decompression of the hull, a fire in the cargo hold (which was not detected due to a damaged fire alarm system sensor), and the loss of elevator controls and progressive electrical failure.

The bearings concerned were roller bearings; each was designed to have 26 rollers inside, but because the supply of the rollers to the factory was delayed—while the bearings had to be finished on time due to expiring contracts—each bearing had only 13 rollers.

Aftermath 

The Okęcie Airport fire crew was aware of the emergency; when the aircraft crashed, they immediately drove towards the crash site, but they did not manage to reach it because the truck could not pass through the gaps between the trees.

Because some burning pieces of hull fell out, several local fires were initiated on the ground, propagated by the dumped fuel; all of them were extinguished by 12:00. A total of 195 firemen from 44 different units participated.

All victims' bodies were dismembered in the crash; from a total of 183 bodies, 62 were never identified.

All crew members posthumously received high military and civil decorations: Cpt. Pawlaczyk was given the Officers' Cross of Polonia Restituta, other flight crew members received the Knights' Cross of the same order, and the flight attendants received the Golden Cross of Merit. The state funeral of the crew was conducted on 23 May 1987 at the Northern Communal Cemetery in Warsaw. The graves of the crew of LOT Polish Airlines Flight 007 are located a few hundred meters away.

Two days of national mourning were announced after the crash. Many officials from all  over world, including Pope John Paul II, himself a Pole, expressed their condolences to the families of the victims.

The accident's cause was similar to that of LOT Polish Airlines Flight 007's crash seven years earlier. After the disaster of Flight 007, the Polish investigatory commission established that its engine shaft disintegration was the result of metal fatigue; improper alloy preparation resulting in a defective mechanism which was less resistant to fatigue; and a faulty design of the engine shaft. Detection of these faults was possible only after complete disassembly of the engine and detailed analysis of all its elements, and as such was beyond the capabilities of aircraft maintenance personnel. These concerns were addressed by the Polish government's Special Disasters Commission in the 1980 inquiry, but the Soviet designers, engineers, and scientists disagreed with these findings, stating that the turbine disintegration was the result of engine failure, not its cause.

After Flight 5055's demise, a similar report was sent to Moscow, but was initially dismissed by the Soviet engineers and politicians. The Soviet engineers even made their own report, concluding that all damage to the engines was the consequence of the crash, which was caused by pilot error. Despite pressure and threats from the Soviets, though, the Polish commission stood by its findings; finally, Soviet engineers and politicians reluctantly accepted responsibility. Soon after the crash, LOT Polish Airlines, still being unable to purchase non-Soviet aircraft, implemented several improvements in the Il-62s' construction:

Doubling the flight control systems (an issue raised in the 1980 report, but never addressed by Soviet engineers)
Installing an advanced system of engine shaft vibration detectors in every engine
Installing more advanced smoke detectors in cargo holds (smoke detectors were found to be more reliable than the fire detectors already used) and advanced fire detectors in the engine nacelles
Replacing all flammable components in the cargo holds with nonflammable ones
Mandatory laboratory testing of engine lubricating oil after every flight (the test, had it been conducted earlier, would have detected the damage to the bearings)

Today 

After the crash, the place where Flight 5055 came down and exploded was—during three months of cleanup—ploughed and sown with new trees. As of 2020, the long scar in the forest is still perfectly visible from the air. On the south edge of the scar is a monument—a high, black Christian cross and a black stone engraved with the names of the crash victims. Ursynów district has a Zygmunt Pawlaczyk street, and through Kabaty Forest runs a grove of trees named for the Kościuszko.

Symbolic graves of the crew members lie in Powązki Military Cemetery, and a collective grave of unidentified victims lies in Wólka Węglowa Cemetery—the place where the victims were identified. Some identified victims were also buried there; others were buried in their home towns.

The Warsaw to New York route was operated by the IL-62 until 1989, when the first Boeing 767 was introduced and later replaced by the Boeing 787 in 2012.

See also 

List of accidents and incidents involving commercial aircraft
List of disasters in Poland by death toll
1972 Königs Wusterhausen air disaster
Air Algérie Flight 6289
Dana Air Flight 992
Baikal Airlines Flight 130
United Airlines Flight 232

References

External links 

 

1987 in Poland
5055
Airliner accidents and incidents caused by mechanical failure
Airliner accidents and incidents caused by in-flight fires
Aviation accidents and incidents in Poland
Aviation accidents and incidents in 1987
Accidents and incidents involving the Ilyushin Il-62
1980s in Warsaw
May 1987 events in Europe
Airliner accidents and incidents involving uncontained engine failure
1987 disasters in Poland